The Open de Oeiras is a professional tennis tournament played on clay courts. It is currently part of the ATP Challenger Tour. It was first held in Oeiras, Portugal during 2021.

Victories records are detained by Portuguese tennis players both on singles with Gastão Elias and in doubles with Nuno Borges and Francisco Cabral with 3 victories each one. They have obtained them simultaneously two times in the 2022 I and II editions, making them one-flag winners editions.

Past finals

Singles

Doubles

References

 
2021 establishments in Portugal
Recurring sporting events established in 2021